America is an unincorporated community in Pulaski County, Illinois, United States.

Founded in part by the American entrepreneur Justus Post, Post made attempts to establish a community like the one he had previously constructed near St. Louis Missouri that is now today Chesterfield, Missouri.  It was the county seat of Alexander County, Illinois, from the county's establishment in 1819 until Unity became the county seat in 1833. In 1843, when Pulaski County was created, America became part of the new county.

References

Unincorporated communities in Pulaski County, Illinois
Unincorporated communities in Illinois